Down Rio Grande Way is a 1942 American Western film directed by William Berke and written by Paul Franklin. The film stars Charles Starrett, Russell Hayden, Britt Wood, Rose Anne Stevens, Norman Willis and Davison Clark. The film was released on April 23, 1942, by Columbia Pictures.

The copyright for the film Down Rio Grande Way was renewed in 1970.

Plot

Cast          
Charles Starrett as Steve Martin
Russell Hayden as 'Lucky' Haines
Britt Wood as Britt Haines
Rose Anne Stevens as Mary Ann Baldridge
Norman Willis as Keno Jack Vandall
Davison Clark as Colonel Elihu Baldridge
Edmund Cobb as Stoner
Budd Buster as Clem Kearney
Joseph Eggenton as Judge Randolph Henderson
Paul Newlan as Sam Houston
Betty Roadman as Annie Haines

References

External links
 

1942 films
1940s English-language films
American Western (genre) films
1942 Western (genre) films
Columbia Pictures films
Films directed by William A. Berke
American black-and-white films
1940s American films